A silent alarm is a burglar alarm that makes no noise that is audible to the trespasser. The alarm makes an audible noise or visual notification elsewhere and notifies the police. A silent alarm may also be a panic button alarm.

The term still alarm is used for a fire alarm transmitted silently, usually by telephone, rather than by sounding the conventional signal or bell apparatus. Still alarms are commonly used to alert fire and medical personnel as to what type of emergency they are responding to.  

Fire detection and alarm